The 2018 Men's South American Volleyball Club Championship is the tenth official edition of the men's volleyball tournament, played by seven teams from 27 February to 3 March 2018, second time in Montes Claros, Minas Gerais, Brazil.
Sada Cruzeiro won its third consecutive title, the fifth overall, and qualified for the 2018 FIVB Volleyball Men's Club World Championship in Poland. Robertlandy Simón was elected the Most Valuable Player.

Pools composition

Preliminary round
All times are Brasília Time (UTC−03:00).

Pool A

|}

|}

Pool B

|}

|}

Final round

Bracket

Fifth place match

|}

Semifinals

|}

Third place match

|}

Final

|}

Final standing

All-Star team

Most Valuable Player
 Robertlandy Simón (Sada Cruzeiro)
Best Opposite
 Fabrício Dias (Montes Claros Vôlei)
Best Outside Hitters
 Yoandy Leal (Sada Cruzeiro)
 Lucas Ocampo (Lomas Vóley)

Best Setter
 Nicolás Uriarte (Sada Cruzeiro)
Best Middle Blockers
 Isac Santos (Sada Cruzeiro)
 Jonadabe Carneiro (Lomas Vóley) 
Best Libero
 Sérgio Nogueira (Sada Cruzeiro)

See also

2018 Women's South American Volleyball Club Championship

References

External links
CSV

Volleyball
Men's South American Volleyball Club Championship
Volleyball
Men's South American Volleyball Club Championship
Sport in Minas Gerais
February 2018 sports events in South America
March 2018 sports events in South America